Lieutenant General Samuel Holt Lomax (2 August 1855 – 10 April 1915) was a British Army officer who commanded the 1st Division during the early battles of the First World War. He was fatally wounded in action in October 1914 at the First Battle of Ypres, being one of the most senior British officers to die on active service during the war.

Early military career
Born 2 August 1855 to Thomas and Mary Helen Lomax of Grove Park in Yoxford, Suffolk, Lomax joined the Scottish 90th Regiment of Foot as a junior officer aged eighteen in June 1874. In 1877 he went with the regiment to South Africa and participated in the 9th Cape Frontier War, and the latter phase of the Zulu War in 1878, seeing action at Kambula and Ulundi, which secured British victory in the campaign. Returning to Britain with his regiment Lomax was promoted to captain following the Cardwell Reforms which amalgamated his regiment into the Scottish Rifles in 1881. 
His unit was not called on for service in India or the Boer War and he did not see further action for 36 years. He was promoted to major in 1886, lieutenant-colonel in 1897, and colonel in 1901. In early 1902, he was transferred to a temporary staff posting as Assistant Adjutant General of the 2nd Army Corps from 26 February 1902, an appointment which was made permanent later the same year. In 1904 he was given an operational command, 10th Brigade. He was promoted to major-general in 1908, and in 1910 given command of the 1st Division. This was normally a four-year posting, and in late July 1914 he received notice that he would not be further employed due to his advanced age and lack of military experience.

World War 1
The outbreak of the First World War in August 1914 put all plans of retirement on hold and Lomax was given command of the British Army's 1st Division as part of the Expeditionary Force being dispatched to France under the leadership of Sir General Sir John French. After taking part in the Battle of Mons in August 1914, Lomax commanded the Division through the First Battle of the Marne, and in the counter-attack on the German invasion of the West at the First Battle of the Aisne. His direction of operations was so accomplished that it has been said that he was "the best Divisional General in the early days of the war". On the 19 October 1914 he received notice that he was to be promoted to the rank of Lieutenant-General, and was marked to be given the command of a Corps when one next became available.

1st Battle of Ypres
In late October 1914 the 1st Division was engaged in extremely heavy fighting at the First Battle of Ypres in Belgium, with its headquarters in a chateau at Hooge, recently vacated by General Douglas Haig commanding I Corps. During the course of the battle, at a moment of crisis with 1st Division's line under mounting pressure from a German attack threatening the destruction of 1st Division and I Corps as a whole and a breach of the line being contested, Lomax received an offer from Haig of reinforcements from I Corps rapidly diminishing reserve troop strength being sent up to his sector to shore up its crumbling defences, Lomax refusing by reply, stating: "More troops now only means more casualties, it is artillery fire that is wanted". On 31 October 1914, at the height of the battle, with the Germans launching repeated mass man assaults on the weakening British line, supported by concentrated barrages of fire from their artillery, a meeting took place at the chateau H.Q. between Lomax and his 2nd Division counterpart, Major-General C. C. Monro. An eye-witness at the scene noted that the officers' staff parked along the roadside outside the building provided an obvious target to German artillery spotters seeking targets to call fire down on to. A German aviator is thought to have noticed the gathering and reported it to a German artillery unit, which fired several 5.9" shells at the chateau. Both sides had been targeting chateaux on either side of the line in an attempt to kill senior officers to gain some advantage in the dead-locked battle by this stage. The first shell exploded in the chateau's garden, causing the staff officers at the meeting to go to the windows of the garden room to see the result of the detonation, when the second shell landed in front of them, the blast killing six and seriously wounding Lomax and another officer. A third shell struck an empty part of the house, its owner, Baron de Vinck, narrowly escaping injury from that blast. General Monro had stepped into another room in the building with his Chief-of-Staff just before the shells struck, and survived with minor injuries; however, Lomax was seriously wounded and medically evacuated back to England. Major-General David Henderson stepping in to assume command of the 1st Division.

Death

On arrival back in England Lomax was treated in a nursing home in London, where he received palliative care for the next five months
before dying of his wounds in his 60th year on the 10 April 1915. His body was cremated at Golders Green Crematorium, and his ashes were buried at Aldershot Military Cemetery, later to be joined by his wife's under a private headstone.

Sir Arthur Conan Doyle later wrote that Lomax's early death in the war had deprived the British High Command of a talented General, which "was a brain injury to the Army and a desperately serious one."

Notes

Bibliography

 

1855 births
1915 deaths
Military personnel from Suffolk
British Army lieutenant generals
Cameronians officers
British Army personnel of the Anglo-Zulu War
British Army generals of World War I
British military personnel killed in World War I
Burials at Aldershot Military Cemetery
British military personnel of the 9th Cape Frontier War